Florin Gheorghe Borța (born 21 June 1999) is a Romanian professional footballer who plays as a right-back for Liga I club Petrolul Ploiești, on loan from Liga I club Universitatea Craiova.

References

External links
 
 
 

1999 births
Living people
Sportspeople from Râmnicu Vâlcea
Romanian footballers
Romania under-21 international footballers
Association football defenders
Liga I players
CS Universitatea Craiova players
Liga II players
FC Petrolul Ploiești players
CS Concordia Chiajna players